This article charts a Quality of life index by country as determined by World Population Review, an independent organization.

Countries 
This list includes 87 countries in the world and updated in 2022. A higher number indicates a higher quality of life in the country .

See also 
 List of countries by life expectancy
 Happy Planet Index

References

Lists by country
Quality of life
International rankings
Sustainability metrics and indices